Springfield is the name of some places in the U.S. state of Wisconsin:
Springfield, Dane County, Wisconsin, a town
Springfield, Jackson County, Wisconsin, a town
Springfield, Marquette County, Wisconsin, a town
Springfield, St. Croix County, Wisconsin, a town
Springfield, Walworth County, Wisconsin, an unincorporated community
Springfield Corners, Wisconsin, an unincorporated community